The 2012 AFC Challenge Cup qualification phase saw eight teams advance to the final tournament in Nepal. The qualification draw was held on 20 October 2010, in AFC House in Kuala Lumpur, Malaysia.

Seeding
The seedings are based on the 2010 AFC Challenge Cup. Unlike previous editions with the exception of the inaugural edition, no team has been given direct entry into the 2012 AFC Challenge Cup.  Defending champions Korea DPR, runners-up Turkmenistan and third-placed Tajikistan would now have to go through the qualifiers to enter the finals.  The eight lowest ranked teams would take part in the playoff round while the remaining 12 teams would enter the Group Stage.

Qualifying play-off round
For the pre-qualifying phase, the eight lowest ranked teams played off over two legs on a home-and-away basis with the away goals rule, extra time and penalty shootouts to determine winners if necessary. The matches took place on 9 and 16 February 2011 with the four winners advancing to the group stage.  However, for Afghanistan–Bhutan fixtures, they were rescheduled for 23 and 25 March and were played in at the Tau Devi Lal Stadium in Gurgaon, India.

The second leg of the Philippines–Mongolia fixture was originally due to take place on 16 February 2011.  However, in early January 2011, Philippine Football Federation president Mariano Araneta said he wanted the match to take place at the same venue as the first leg on 12 February, citing the winter conditions in Mongolia. Mongolian Football Federation president Ganbold Buyannemekh insisted that the second leg be played in Mongolia but proposed a 15 March date instead as a compromise.

|}

First leg

Second leg

Afghanistan win 5–0 on aggregate

Philippines win 3–2 on aggregate

Chinese Taipei win 6–3 on aggregate

Cambodia win 5–4 on aggregate

Qualifying group stage
In the group stage, the 16 teams were divided into four groups of four teams each playing a single round-robin tournament (league system). This included the 12 highest ranked automatically qualified teams and the four qualifiers from the playoff round. The original match days were 20–31 March 2011. The top two teams in each group qualified for the final tournament.  On 18 February 2011, the AFC announced that the hosts for each group were: Myanmar for Group A, Malaysia for Group B, Maldives for Group C, and Nepal for Group D; with match dates on 21, 23 and 25 March 2011.

However, for Group D, the All Nepal Football Association proposed the hosting rights since the end of December 2010, which the AFC had endorsed.  The fixtures were also scheduled to take place from 21 to 25 March but on 7 February 2011 it was announced that the qualifiers had to be postponed due to the unavailability of the main stadium (Dasarath Rangasala Stadium) due to a wrestling event.  The fixtures were then been set to 7 to 11 April 2011.

The teams were ranked according to points (3 points for a win, 1 point for a tie, 0 points for a loss) and tie breakers are in following order:
Greater number of points obtained in the group matches between the teams concerned;
Goal difference resulting from the group matches between the teams concerned;
Greater number of goals scored in the group matches between the teams concerned;
Goal difference in all the group matches;
Greater number of goals scored in all the group matches;
Kicks from the penalty mark if only two teams are involved and they are both on the field of play;
Fewer score calculated according to the number of yellow and red cards received in the group matches; (1 point for each yellow card, 3 points for each red card as a consequence of two yellow cards, 3 points for each direct red card, 4 points for each yellow card followed by a direct red card)
Drawing of lots.

Group A
Times are Myanmar Time (MMT) – UTC+6:30

Group B
Times are Malaysia Standard Time (MST) – UTC+8

Group C
Times are Maldives Time (MVT) – UTC+5

Group D
Times are Nepal Time (NPT) – UTC+5:45

Qualifiers
The following eight teams qualified for the 2012 AFC Challenge Cup held from 8 to 19 March 2012 in Nepal:
  – Group A winners
  – Group A runners-up
  – Group B winners
  – Group B runners-up
  – Group C winners
  – Group C runners-up
  – Group D winners
  – Group D runners-up

Goalscorers
4 goals
 Jeje Lalpekhlua
 Murad Alyan

3 goals

 Sidiq Walizada
 Sam El Nasa
 Ali Ashfaq
 Choe Kum-Chol

2 goals

 Kouch Sokumpheak
 Chang Han
 Chen Po-liang
 Cholponbek Esenkul Uulu
 Leong Ka Hang
 Ri Chol-Myong
 Arif Mehmood
 Ángel Guirado
 James Younghusband

1 goal

 Mustafa Hadid
 Israfeel Kohistani
 Waheed Nadeem
 Shakil Ahmed
 Abdul Baten Komol
 Khim Borey
 Khoun Laboravy
 Sok Rithy
 Lin Cheng-yi
 Lo Chih-an
 Sunil Chhetri
 Steven Dias
 Jewel Raja Shaikh
 Aziz Sydykov
 Rustem Usanov
 Phattana Syvilay
 Kitsada Tongkhen
 Soukaphone Vongchiengkham
 Vernon
 Vinício
 Ashad Ali
 Mukhthar Naseer
 Shamweel Qasim
 Bayasgalangiin Garidmagnai
 Donorovyn Lkhümbengarav
 Khin Maung Lwin
 Zaw Htat Aung
 Bharat Khawas
 Jong Il-Gwan
 Pak Nam-Chol
 Atif Bashir
 Ahmed Harbi
 Ian Araneta
 Emelio Caligdong
 Phil Younghusband
 Nuriddin Davronov
 Davronjon Ergashev
 Ibrahim Rabimov
 Arslanmyrat Amanow
 Gahrymanberdi Çoňkaýew
 Mämmedaly Garadanow
 Guwanç Hangeldiýew
 Berdi Şamyradow
 Didargylyç Urazow

Own goal
 Ruslan Sydykov (playing against Tajikistan)
 Assad Abdul Ghani (playing against Kyrgyzstan)

References

External links
AFC Challenge Cup

Qualification
qual